Capital One Arena is an indoor arena in Washington, D.C. Located in the Penn Quarter neighborhood, the arena sits atop the Gallery Place rapid transit station of the Washington Metro. It has been largely considered to be a commercial success and is regarded as one of the driving catalysts of the revitalization of Washington, D.C.'s Chinatown neighborhood. Like many storefront signs in Chinatown, a part of the arena's large sign is written in Chinese characters, right below the English name of the sponsor.

Owned and operated by Monumental Sports & Entertainment, it is the home arena of the Washington Capitals of the National Hockey League (NHL), the Washington Wizards of the National Basketball Association (NBA), and the Georgetown University men's basketball team. It was also home to the Washington Mystics of the Women's National Basketball Association (WNBA) from 1998 to 2018, after which they moved to the Entertainment and Sports Arena in southeast Washington for the 2019 season.

History
The block where the arena was built, between 6th and 7th and F and G Streets, historically held a mix of residences and small businesses. By the 1960s, it was suffering from urban decay, like much of the eastern end of Downtown Washington. In 1973, while the Gallery Place Metro station was being developed below it, the District government bought the land in hopes of redeveloping it. Capital Landmark Associates was selected in 1979 to develop the site with a planned mixed-use complex including retail, offices, apartments, and a hotel. Most of the remaining buildings on the site were demolished in 1985. The project languished for many years but never materialized, and was finally canceled in 1992.

Before the arena's opening, the Capitals and the Wizards (then known as the Washington Bullets) played at USAir Arena in the Washington suburb of Landover, Maryland. The teams experienced subpar attendance because the location was inconvenient for both Washington and Baltimore residents, and their arena, though only 20 years old, was not up to the standards of other NBA and NHL venues. In December 1993, Abe Pollin, the owner of both teams, began studying options to move the teams to a new arena to be built with public financing, with possible locations including Baltimore, downtown Washington, and Laurel, Maryland.

A group of Washington business leaders brokered a deal between Pollin and the District government to build an arena at the Gallery Place site, with the District paying for the $150-million project, which was envisioned to have shopping, food, and exhibitors for daily use even when there was no arena event. The D.C. Council approved a special tax on businesses to finance the deal. However, a competing proposal soon emerged, when Robert Johnson, head of Black Entertainment Television, offered to build the arena with mostly private financing. With the arena deal facing criticism amid the District's budget crisis, Pollin eventually agreed to privately fund the construction of the building, which ultimately came to $200 million (US$ in  dollars). The District would pay for other costs, including purchasing the portion of the land it did not already own, preparing the site, and expanding the Metro station; these eventually amounted to $79 million (US$ in  dollars). The District leased the land to Pollin at a below-market rate of $300,000 per year.

A naming rights deal was struck with MCI Communications to name the arena as the MCI Center. The groundbreaking ceremony for the project was held in October 1995. On December 2, 1997, the arena held its first event, a game between the Wizards and the Seattle SuperSonics, with President Bill Clinton in attendance. The arena had a 25,000 square foot Discovery Channel Store from 1998 to 2001 and the MCI National Sports Gallery, an interactive sports museum with interactive games, memorabilia, and the American Sportscasters Hall of Fame inside from 1998 to 2000 or 2001 which was repurposed for office space. Clinton toured the gallery before the game, playing the museum games.  A block of F Street NW between 6th and 7th Street NW outside the arena was declared Fun Street, complete with signage. This block later was declared Abe Pollin Way in 2007. The arena was noted for building spectator seats vertically rather than out, creating better views for all attending albeit with limited leg room in the upper levels, as well as spacious quarters for players and coaches with advanced competitive research technology. The arena concourse featured multimedia arenaNet stations where fans could check scores, watch highlights, and send digital postcards over email. These replaced an abandoned idea to have smart seats with televisions and technology that was scrapped due to technological challenges. Arena technology was powered by a virtual LAN software and switching technology called ArenaNET from Cabletron Systems.

In 1999, a group led by technology executive Ted Leonsis bought a 36% stake in Pollin's holdings, including the MCI Center, as well as full ownership of the Capitals. The Leonsis group increased its stake to 44% in 2000.

In January 2006, Verizon Communications purchased MCI and the arena's name was changed accordingly to Verizon Center. VIDA Fitness opened its first location in the arena that same year. The following year, in 2007, the "first true indoor high-definition LED scoreboard" was installed in the arena.

In June 2010, following Pollin's death in November 2009, the Leonsis group, newly organized as Monumental Sports & Entertainment, bought out Pollin's interests, gaining full ownership of the arena and the Wizards.

A report emerged in May 2015 that Verizon would not renew its naming rights to the Verizon Center when its agreement with Monumental was to end in 2018. In the same week, it was announced that Etihad Airways signed a deal to become the official airline of the arena, sparking speculation that Etihad might be the leading contender to assume naming rights in 2017. However, on August 9, 2017, it was announced the bank Capital One had purchased the rights, renaming the venue Capital One Arena.

In 2019 and 2020, Monumental Sports and Entertainment Network undertook a $30 million renovation of the stadium. This included completely replacing the arena's seating, improving the concourse, and altering many of the arena's dining options. A new, larger overhead video board was also added as well as a new SkyRing video screen that goes around the top of the arena.

In July 2020, bookmaker William Hill opened a sportsbook at the arena, following the 2018 legalization of sports betting in Washington. It was the first brick-and-mortar sportsbook in the District, and the first to open at a professional sports venue in the United States.

Sports

Ice hockey

The arena has been home to the Capitals NHL team since its opening. As a result, numerous memorable moments in franchise history have occurred in the arena. The arena hosted games three and four of the 1998 Stanley Cup Finals, when the Capitals lost to the Detroit Red Wings in four games. The Red Wings hoisted the cup in the arena on June 16, 1998, after winning game four by a score of 4–1. On April 5, 2008, the Capitals won the Southeast Division in the last game of the regular season, after beating the Florida Panthers 3–1. May 4, 2009 saw dueling hat tricks from Ovechkin and rival Sidney Crosby of the Pittsburgh Penguins during a playoff game. The arena also hosted games three and four of the 2018 Stanley Cup Finals. The Capitals won both games and then went on to win game five in Las Vegas, which won them the Stanley Cup. This was the first major sports championship for a Washington, D.C. team since the 1991 Washington Redskins. The Capitals had their Stanley Cup banner ceremony in the arena before their first game of the next season, which took place on October 3, 2018.

Also, the arena hosted the 2009 "Frozen Four," the final round of the 2009 NCAA Division I Men's Ice Hockey Tournament.

Basketball
The arena has been home to the Wizards NBA team since its opening and was home to the Washington Mystics WNBA team from 1998 to 2018, before moving to a new, smaller arena in the Congress Heights area of southeast Washington. The Georgetown Hoyas men's basketball team has also played there since the arena's opening. The arena has hosted three basketball all star games: the 2001 NBA All-Star Game and the 2002 and 2007 WNBA All-Star Games. The arena has been home to many playoff games for the various playoff teams but has yet to host an NBA finals series.

The arena has hosted NCAA Division I men's basketball tournament rounds several times. It hosted first and second round games in 1998, 2002, 2008 and 2011, and hosted the regional finals in 2006, 2013 and 2019. Most notably the 2005–06 George Mason Patriots men's basketball team from nearby Fairfax, Virginia advanced to the Final Four in the arena. The arena also hosted the Atlantic 10 men's basketball tournament in 2018 and 2022. It hosted the ACC men's basketball tournament in 2005 and 2016.

The Harlem Globetrotters play in the arena on an annual basis.

Fighting and wrestling
In the professional fighting world, the arena has hosted WWE events, as well as the final four editions of WCW's Starrcade. The arena has hosted Backlash in 2000, SummerSlam in 2005, Cyber Sunday in 2007, Survivor Series in 2009, Capitol Punishment in 2011, and Battleground in 2016. The arena frequently hosts Raw and SmackDown shows as well. The arena was also home to Mike Tyson's final fight (Mike Tyson vs. Kevin McBride) on June 11, 2005 and on October 1, 2011, UFC Live: Cruz vs. Johnson was held at the arena.

On December 7, 2019, UFC on ESPN: Overeem vs. Rozenstruik was held at the arena.

On October 2, 2019, the Capital One Arena hosted AEW Dynamite, the first televised professional wrestling event by All Elite Wrestling. It was broadcast on TNT in the United States of America and on ITV4 in the United Kingdom.

Arena football
In 2017, the Washington Valor began play at the arena for their inaugural season in the Arena Football League. The Valor folded in 2019 and the arena has not hosted an Arena League game since.

Gymnastics and figure skating
The arena hosted the 2003 World Figure Skating Championships and the 2016 Kellogg's Tour of Gymnastics Champions.

Music and other entertainment
The arena is a major location for concerts and cultural events in the D.C. region. Among the musical performers, cultural figures, and entertainment shows that have performed at the arena are Janet Jackson, Mariah Carey, Paul McCartney, U2, Iron Maiden, Lady Gaga, Madonna, the Three Tenors, Drake, Barbra Streisand, Bon Jovi, Prince, Tim McGraw, Faith Hill, Beyoncé, the Dalai Lama, Tina Turner, Keith Urban, Paul Simon, Sting, Taylor Swift, Coldplay, Tyler, the Creator, Elton John, Usher, Green Day, the Who, Bad Bunny, Billie Eilish, Dua Lipa, Trans-Siberian Orchestra,  Disney on Ice, and K-POP group Seventeen. 

The Washington International Horse Show took place every October in the arena for more than 20 years through 2019, after which it was moved out because of the Covid-19 pandemic.

Criticism

Gentrification 
When the arena opened, there was concern that it would lead to the displacement of Chinese businesses and culture in the area that is the city's Chinatown. The surrounding area has indeed been dramatically gentrified, and most of the Chinese residents and businesses who lived and operated in the neighborhood when the arena first opened have been displaced because of the spike in real estate prices. 2011 estimates hold that the number of Chinese in the neighborhood is down to around 400 to 500.  The Chinese-owned restaurants and businesses in the Chinatown area are largely gone and there has not been a full-service Chinese grocery in the neighborhood since 2005.

Ice quality issues
In December 2007, then-Capitals captain Chris Clark stated that he believed the arena had the worst ice in the NHL. "There's a lot of ruts in the ice. It's soft. It's wet half the time. I could see a lot of injuries coming from the ice there. It could cost [players] their jobs... Even guys on other teams say the same thing. When we're facing off, they say, 'How do you guys play on this?'" Capitals owner Ted Leonsis addressed this criticism directly. The ice quality issue has been persistent both since the opening of the facility and with the Capitals franchise in general.  Since Leonsis' acquisition of the facility, the quality of the ice has got better and number of complaints has noticeably decreased. During playoff games, the arena installs additional portable refrigeration units outside the arena to aid the ice conditions during the warm and humid summer months.

Gallery

See also
 List of NCAA Division I basketball arenas
 List of National Hockey League arenas
 List of National Basketball Association arenas
 Sports in Washington, D.C.

References

1997 establishments in Washington, D.C.
Basketball venues in Washington, D.C.
Capital One
Chinatown (Washington, D.C.)
College basketball venues in the United States
College ice hockey venues in the United States
Georgetown Hoyas basketball venues
Gymnastics venues in Washington, D.C.
Indoor ice hockey venues in Washington, D.C.
Indoor lacrosse venues in the United States
Mixed martial arts venues in Washington, D.C.
National Basketball Association venues
National Hockey League venues
Sports venues completed in 1997
Washington Wizards venues
Washington Mystics venues
Washington Capitals